Neil McVicar may refer to:
 Neil McVicar (politician)
 Neil McVicar (minister)